Tales Too Ticklish to Tell is the sixth collection of the comic strip series Bloom County by Berkeley Breathed.  It was published in 1988.  The cover image, of Opus sitting on the lap of George H. W. Bush, is a parody of the infamous photo of Donna Rice and Gary Hart from May 1987.

It is preceded by Billy and the Boingers Bootleg and followed by The Night of the Mary Kay Commandos.

The book includes "an exciting copy of the Bloom Picayune", plus an introduction supposedly by Mikhail Gorbachev.

Synopses of major storylines

 Steve Dallas, imprisoned in place of his motel-wrecking bandmates, is coerced into rewriting their contracts and relinquishing his share of royalties.  Returning from Albuquerque, Steve and Opus uncomfortably share a motel room.  Once home, Bill the Cat's song "U Stink But I ♥ You" is bought by Nabisco for a Wheat Thins jingle.  Bill, now a multi-millionaire, moves to Malibu, collects an entourage, and orders the Boingers to become a "socially-conscious pop band with leftist overtones" à la U2.  (p1, 16 strips)
 Opus picks up the morning paper to find that he's forgotten about his wedding with Lola Granola.  Steve Dallas, Portnoy, and Hodge-Podge throw Opus a bachelor party, while Lola's mother attempts to teach her promiscuous daughter the "facts of life".  Opus and Lola are wed, but a kissing mishap knocks Opus unconscious.  He dreams of life twenty years in the future: a suffocating marriage with 23 tube-grown children, and eventual abandonment.  He awakens and requests annulment.  (p7, 17 strips)
 "Anatomy of a Scandal".  Bill the Cat is discovered engaging in "bible study" with Sister Edith Drock.  His heavy metal reputation ruined, Bill returns to Bloom County in shame.  (p17, 6 strips)
 Opus takes a job as a garbage collector, or as he calls it, a "waste-management artisan".  He sings and dances, encourages customers to recycle their "old and spoiled dreams", and accidentally reads a mistress's love letter to the wife.  (p21, 7 strips)
 Bill the Cat is "born again".  "Fundamentally Oral Bill" rockets to televangelism stardom by raising money to "call home" rivals Falwell, Swaggart, Bakker, and Roberts.  After Bill preaches against the ultimate sin of penguin lust, Opus is persecuted and forced to leave Bloom County.  (p26, 21 strips)
 Oliver accidentally makes amateur radio contact with Zygorthian space aliens.  The aliens descend and wreak havoc upon Earth until they are called to testify before a congressional sub-committee.  (p35, 11 strips)
 Oliver isolates the hallucinogenic chemical in dandelions, which his father then accidentally ingests.  His father spends the day in the tool shed, concerned that Erik Estrada is trying to come out of his navel.  (p40, 7 strips)
 Binkley's father turns 40, and is convinced that his body is the verge of falling apart.  (p42, 4 strips)
 Milo receives a letter from exiled Opus, who is working as a male stripper in Arizona.  (p45, 6 strips)
 Oliver receives a Dickens-like visit from his childhood teddy bear, who protests Oliver's preference for the modern over the traditional.  Oliver is re-introduced to his old slide rule.  (p48, 6 strips)
 The strip takes a turn for the meta, as Opus is found wandering along without a script, and is forced to improvise a story.  He ends up lost in a desert, where his mother appears to him in a hallucination and gives him the strength to go on.  Finally, he returns to Bloom County.  He finds that Steve Dallas has taken over his role as Spock.  (p50, 21 strips)
 The strip's unionized cast goes on strike for a "larger comic-strip size standard to avoid legibility problems".  After management unsuccessfully attempts to fill in, auditions are held for scabs.  The union eventually capitulates, their demands unmet.  (p59, 23 strips)
 Binkley's father comes to terms with his ruination following the stock market crash. (p72, 3 strips)
 Tammy Faye visits Binkley's anxiety closet, terrifying the resident anxieties.  She starts to cry and floods the house.  (p77, 3 strips)
 It is revealed that Portnoy is a groundhog, appalling his best friend Hodge-Podge, who refuses to "work with pigs".  (p78, 6 strips)
 Opus gives his friends extravagant, unmatchable Christmas presents.  (p84, 4 strips)
 Little Monica, whose brother Bobby has become a "homicidal Rambo-phile" since receiving war toys for Christmas, hires Steve Dallas to sue Santa Claus.  Santa's pin-striped legal elf presents an intimidating defense, but it is Steve's own mother who ruins his case.  (p86, 11 strips)
 At the Bloom Picayune, Opus is transferred to the Ombudsman desk.  He struggles to deal with miffed readers.  (p91, 9 strips)
 The 1988 Meadow Party caucus once again nominates Bill the Cat for presidential candidate.  He is free of recent scandals, having been in a tequila coma for fourteen months.  (p97, 10 strips)
 Opus worries about the privacy implications of satellites that can photograph him picking his nose.  (p104, 3 strips)
 Opus calls 9-1-1 for trivial reasons.  (p110, 3 strips)
 Steve Dallas is kidnapped by space aliens who trans-reverse, or "Gephardize", his brain, inverting his personality and flip-flopping his opinions and attitudes.  He returns to Earth a passive, permed, brie-eating Jesse Jackson supporter. (p111, 23 strips)
 Fire Back: "Where the Readers Respond".  Representatives of activist groups are given space to protest stereotypes and slurs used in the strip.  (p120, 5 strips)

Bloom County
Books by Berkeley Breathed
Little, Brown and Company books
1988 books